Bismuth is a metallic chemical element with symbol Bi and atomic number 83.

Bismuth may also refer to:

Entertainment
 "Bismuth" (Steven Universe), an episode of Steven Universe
 Bismuth, a character in Steven Universe (see List of Steven Universe characters)

People
Bismuth is also a French-language surname. People with the name include:
 David Bismuth (born 1975), French classical pianist
  (born 1934), French surgeon
  (1889–1916), French sergeant
 Joseph Bismuth (1926–2019), Tunisian businessman and senator
  (born 1973), French artist
 Nadine Bismuth (born 1975), Canadian short story writer and writer
 Patrick Bismuth (born 1954), French classical violinist and conductor
 Pierre Bismuth (born 1963), French artist and filmmaker
  (born 1996), French singer
  (born 1938), French-Tunisian historian

See also

 Isotopes of bismuth
 Bi (disambiguation)
  (1891–1965), French-Tunisian painter